Henan University of Technology (HUT) is a public university in Zhengzhou, Henan, China. It was formed in 2004 as a merger of Zhengzhou Institute of Technology and Zhengzhou Polytechnic Institute, both established in 1956.

History
Henan University of Technology traces its roots to 1956. Food Sciences and Technology is one of its key specialities which includes cereal science and technology, cereal based food, storage of cereal grains and their products, oil and fat chemistry and technology. Grain physical distribution and grain machinery are also key specialty of this university.

Staff
Now there are more than 30,000 students who receive full-time education here. Among the 2,200 staff members, 10 are academicians, 300 have doctor's degrees, and over 800 are full or associate professors. The university library houses 3 million books, 170 thousand of which are thread-bound ancient writings and 200 thousand books and magazines in foreign languages. The museum houses a  collection of valuable cultural relics. With its first-class equipment the key labs are available for various scientific experiments. In addition, the university has its teaching & research institutions such as the Computing Centre, the Network Centre, the Survey and Experiment Centre, and the Audio-Visual Education Centre. The old campus is located on Songshan road, yihe road in the south west of Zhengzhou, and the new campus is located on Lianhua road in the north west of Zhengzhou. The modern buildings such as the Science Building, the University Library and the Gymnasium are grand, magnificent and spectacular. They match each other well in radiance and beauty giving a unique style and an elegant taste to the university.

References

External links
Official website

Universities and colleges in Zhengzhou
Educational institutions established in 1956
Technical universities and colleges in China
1956 establishments in China